Bembecia scopigera, the six-belted clearwing,  is a moth of the family Sesiidae. It is found from central Spain over most of south-western and central Europe, the Balkans, Greece, southern Russia and Ukraine to Turkey.

The wingspan is 24–25 mm.

The larvae feed on the roots of Onobrychis species, including Onobrychis sativa, Onobrychis viciinifolia and Onobrychis toumefortii species. Other records include Lotus species and Anthyllis vulneraria.

References

Moths described in 1763
Sesiidae
Moths of Europe
Moths of Asia
Taxa named by Giovanni Antonio Scopoli